Marián Smerčiak (born 24 December 1972) is a Slovak retired professional ice hockey defenceman.

Smerčiak played in the Slovak Extraliga for HK Dukla Trenčín, MHk 32 Liptovský Mikuláš, HC Slovan Bratislava and HK Spišská Nová Ves. He also played in the 1994 Winter Olympics and the 1996 World Championship for the Slovakia national team.

Career statistics

Regular season and playoffs

International

References

External links

1972 births
Living people
Czechoslovak ice hockey defencemen
HK Dubnica players
HK Dukla Trenčín players
Guildford Flames players
Ice hockey players at the 1994 Winter Olympics
MHk 32 Liptovský Mikuláš players
Olympic ice hockey players of Slovakia
Sportspeople from Liptovský Mikuláš
HC Slovan Bratislava players
Slovak ice hockey defencemen
HK Spišská Nová Ves players
Rostock Piranhas players
Expatriate ice hockey players in England
Slovak expatriate sportspeople in England
Slovak expatriate ice hockey players in Germany